Leslie "Les" Alexander H. McKeand (17 September 1924 – 11 November 1950) was an Australian triple jumper and javelin thrower. In the triple jump he won the national title in 1950 and a silver medal at the 1950 British Empire Games, placing seventh at the 1948 Summer Olympics. In the javelin, his best result was seventh place at the 1950 British Empire Games.

McKeand died at the age of 26 in road accident outside Muswellbrook, New South Wales, in 1950. McKeand had attended Sydney University in 1943–1948 and graduated with a Bachelor of Veterinary Science in 1949.

References

External links

Leslie 'Les' McKeand at Australian Athletics Historical Results

1924 births
1950 deaths
Australian male javelin throwers
Australian male triple jumpers
Olympic athletes of Australia
Athletes (track and field) at the 1948 Summer Olympics
Commonwealth Games silver medallists for Australia
Athletes (track and field) at the 1950 British Empire Games
Commonwealth Games medallists in athletics
Road incident deaths in New South Wales
University of Sydney alumni
20th-century Australian people
Medallists at the 1950 British Empire Games